The Pool of the 2006 Fed Cup Asia/Oceania Zone Group II composed of four teams competing in a round robin competition. The top two teams qualified for Group I next year.

Kazakhstan vs. Syria

Kazakhstan vs. Hong Kong

Singapore vs. Syria

Singapore vs. Hong Kong

Kazakhstan vs. Singapore

Syria vs. Hong Kong

  and  advanced to Group I for 2007, but the 2007 Asia/Oceania Zone consisted of simply one group. The Hong Kongers placed sixth overall, while the Kazakhstanis placed eighth.

See also
Fed Cup structure

References

External links
 Fed Cup website

2006 Fed Cup Asia/Oceania Zone